In sports, a hash mark or hash line is a short line/bar marking that is painted perpendicular to the sidelines or side barricades, used to help referees and players recognize on-field locations and visually measure distances.  Hash marks serve the same function as the graduated markings on measuring tools such as rulers.

Usage in ice hockey

In ice hockey, the hash marks are two pairs of parallel lines on either side of the face-off circles in both ends of the rink. Players must remain on their team's side of the hash mark nearest their own goal during a face-off until the puck hits the ice.

Usage in gridiron football

In American football and Canadian football, the hash marks are two rows of lines near the middle of the field that are parallel to the side lines. All plays start with the ball on or between the hash marks. That is, if the ball is downed in between a hash mark and the nearest sideline, it must be placed on that hash mark for the next play.

Prior to the adoption of hash marks (which were first utilized at the first NFL playoff game in ), all plays began where the ball was declared dead, including extra point attempts.

The hashmarks in that indoor 1932 playoff game were originally  from the sideline, and that width was adopted by the NFL for the  season.

High school football, college football and Canadian football have hash marks significantly wider than the goal posts. The college football standard, which was the previous standard in the NFL (–), is 40 feet apart, (20 yards from the sidelines) introduced in 1993. Previously, the college width was the same as the high school standard (with the exception of Texas, which currently uses the current college  width), at one-third of the width of the field.

See also

References

Ice hockey terminology
American football terminology
Canadian football terminology